David Villa is a Spanish professional association footballer who represented the Spain national football team from 2005 to 2017. He made his debut for Spain as a substitute in a 2006 FIFA World Cup qualification match against San Marino in February 2005. He scored his first international goal on his fourth appearance for Spain, scoring from the bench to equalise in the second leg of the 2006 World Cup qualification play-offs. He scored 59 goals in 98 international appearances, making him Spain's all-time top scorer; he surpassed Raúl's previous record of 44 when he scored twice against the Czech Republic in UEFA Euro 2012 qualifying in March 2011.

Villa achieved his inaugural international hat-trick on 10 June 2008 when he scored the first three goals in a 4–1 victory for Spain over Russia during UEFA Euro 2008 to win group D. He scored two other hat-tricks, against Azerbaijan (in 2009) and Tahiti (in 2013). He scored more times against Liechtenstein than any other nation, with seven, including twice in a single match on three occasions. Twenty of Villa's goals were scored at home at thirteen different venues.

Villa scored more goals in qualifying matches than in any other type of match, with 21. He scored nineteen times in friendlies, nine times in FIFA World Cup finals, six times in the FIFA Confederations Cup and four times in UEFA European Championship finals. Villa was equal top scorer at the 2010 FIFA World Cup, alongside Germany's Thomas Müller, Netherlands' Wesley Sneijder and Uruguay's Diego Forlán, all of whom scored five goals in the tournament. Villa broke his leg playing for his club team FC Barcelona in December 2011, which resulted in his failure to take part in Spain's victorious UEFA Euro 2012 campaign. He left Barcelona in 2013 to join La Liga opposition team Atlético Madrid for a season before moving to New York City FC in Major League Soccer in the summer of 2014. His last international goal came in June 2014, against Australia at the 2014 FIFA World Cup. After his move to the United States in 2014, he only played one more game for Spain, a 2018 World Cup qualifier against Italy in September 2017. After joining Japanese side Vissel Kobe in 2018, Villa announced his retirement from football at the end of the 2019 J1 League season.

International goals
Scores and results list Spain's goal tally first.

Hat-tricks

Statistics

See also
 List of men's footballers with 50 or more international goals
 List of top international men's football goal scorers by country
 Spain national football team records and statistics

References

Villa, David
Villa, David